WVBL is a public radio formatted broadcast radio station licensed to Bluefield, West Virginia, serving McDowell and Mercer counties in West Virginia and Tazewell and Bland counties in Virginia.  WVBL is owned and operated by West Virginia Educational Broadcasting Authority.

References

External links
West Virginia Public Broadcasting Online

NPR member stations
VBL